Stephen Mark Freiburger (born July 16, 1983) is an American filmmaker.

Early life and education
 Graduated from the University of North Carolina School of the Arts in 2005.

Film work
 Writer/Director of the upcoming feature film Follow By Night produced by Endeavor Content.
 Co-Writer of the upcoming feature film Arise produced by Sycamore Pictures and Third Coast Content.
 Writer of Birches UK based feature. Based on the novel 'Silver Birches' (published in 2009 by Adrian Plass), was turned into a film starring Natasha Little, Anna Acton and Todd Carty. 
 Shadowed Michael Bay in an apprenticeship program on Transformers: Age of Extinction.
 Wrote and produced The Trial, starring Matthew Modine, Bob Gunton and Robert Forster.  Released by 20th Century Fox.
 Directed and produced Dog Days of Summer. Feature directorial debut.  Released by Sony Pictures Home Entertainment

Commercial work
 Winner of the 2013 Doritos Crash the Super Bowl contest.  His commercial Fashionista Daddy made for a mere $300 beat out thousands of other entries, aired during Super Bowl XLVII on February 3, 2013, and was the #1 ranked :30 commercial of the Super Bowl on the USA Today Ad Meter.  It landed him a mentorship under director Michael Bay on Transformers: Age of Extinction starring Mark Wahlberg.
On January 29, 2014, it was announced during a live broadcast on CBS that his Doritos commercial was ranked the Greatest Super Bowl Commercial of All Time on a countdown of the top 10 commercials in Super Bowl history.
Directed 2 commercials for Join.Me in 2016–2017. 
Directed a PSA featuring Jamie Lee Curtis for The Clare Foundation in 2016.
Directed an IKEA commercial in South Korea for Spring/Summer 2017 campaign.
Directed a campaign of national broadcast commercials for Samaritan's Feet in 2017–2018.
Directed a Microsoft branded film in 2019.
Directed commercials for Reebok, Fara Coffee, Becker Vineyards, Rodney Vineyards, Accenture and Shiner Bock in 2020–2021.

Television work
Directed the Cooper & Joey digital pilot for Nickelodeon.
Directed sketch comedy digital shorts for DreamWorksTV.
Directed the Strong Tower pilot starring Claire Coffee.
Producer on the 2021 PBS Documentary Downing of the Flag.

Theatre work
Directed 110 Stories at Los Angeles' Geffen Playhouse in 2010, which starred Academy Award nominee John Hawkes, Katharine McPhee, Ed Asner, Diane Venora, Malcolm-Jamal Warner, Michael Welch, Nicholas Turturro, Michael Beach and Sharon Lawrence.

Other Work
Directed Season 1 of the narrative podcast series BLACKWOOD, produced by Wondery. Released in October 2018.

References

External links
 

1983 births
Living people
Artists from Charlotte, North Carolina
Artists from Roanoke, Virginia
Film directors from Virginia
Film directors from North Carolina